The 2013 Southeast Missouri State Redhawks football team represented Southeast Missouri State University as a member of the Ohio Valley Conference (OVC) during the 2013 NCAA Division I FCS football season. Led by Tony Samuel in his eighth and final year as head coach, the Redhawks compiled an overall record of 3–9 with a mark of 2–6 in conference play, tying for seventh place in the OVC. Southeast Missouri State played home games at Houck Stadium in Cape Girardeau, Missouri.

Schedule

References

Southeast Missouri State
Southeast Missouri State Redhawks football seasons
Southeast Missouri State Redhawks football